Sullivan is an independent, WBENC-certified woman-owned, brand agency located on the High Line in New York City. Founded in 1990 by Barbara Apple Sullivan, Managing Partner, it has been named an Inc. 5000 "Fastest Growing Company" for eight consecutive years (2010-2018). Working primarily with a roster of blue-chip clients, Sullivan produces integrated marketing, design and digital experiences with a specialty in technology, financial services, higher education and lifestyle.

Notable clients
Sullivan manages companies such as:

 ADP
 American Express
 Bank of America / Merrill Lynch
 Brown University
 Business Wire
 Charles Schwab
 Cognizant
 Cornell Tech
 Crown Castle
 CQ Roll Call
 Duke University
 Human Rights Watch
 Everyday Health
 Fidelity Investments
 Institute for Contemporary Art at VCU
 Liquidnet
 LinkedIn
 National Baseball Hall of Fame
 New York University Stern School of Business
 TD Ameritrade
 Tyco
 WebMD
 Weill Cornell Medical College
 Windstream

Awards
 2015, Fast Co. Innovation by Design Award Finalist, Cornell Tech
 2015, Webby “People's Voice Award" Winner, Cornell Tech 
 2015, Gramercy Institute, “Most Valuable Partner” Award, Sullivan & Imprint 
 2015, BMA B2 for "Best Corporate Brand/Identity" Winner, Crown Castle 
 2015, Appy Award Finalist, National Baseball Hall of Fame “The Beacon” App 
 2014, Content Marketing Institute "Agency of the Year" Finalist, Imprint 
 2012-2014, Inc. Magazine "5000 Fastest Growing Companies in America" 
 2012-2014, Gramercy Institute, “20 Rising Stars” 
 2014, Financial Marketing Strategy “Best Global Strategy” Award, Merrill Lynch 
 2014, Interactive Media "Best in Class: Corporate Website" Award, Baker Tilly 
 2014, CSS Awards "Featured Websites," Duke University & Liquidnet 
 2013, B2B Magazine, "Who's Who" 
 2012, BtoB Magazine, "Top Small Agency of the Year”

References

External links
Official Website
Digital Marketing
Zahnarzt Marketing

Advertising agencies of the United States
Advertising agencies based in New York City
Companies based in New York City